Utto (died 829) was a German abbot.

Utto is a German given name. It may refer to: 

 Utto of Freising (d. 907), bishop of Freising
 Utto Rudolph, pseudonym of Yambo Ouologuem (b. 1940), Malian writer, when he wrote the erotic novel Les Milles et un bibles du sex

See also
 Odo (disambiguation)
 Otto, given name
 Udo (disambiguation)
 Uto (disambiguation)

German masculine given names